The Oxfordshire Museums Council (OMC) is an organisation representing museums in Oxfordshire, England.

OMC was founded in 1983 and represents around 40 museums. It is a registered charity (no. 296734) that is formed of representatives from museums operated by the local authority and Oxford University, as well as independent and volunteer museums.

See also
 List of museums in Oxfordshire
 Museum of Oxford

References

External links
 Oxfordshire Museums Council website

1983 establishments in England
Organizations established in 1983
Charities based in Oxfordshire
Museum organizations
Oxfordshire Museums Council